Two-Mix Tribute Album "Crysta-Rhythm" is a various artists album paying tribute to J-pop duo Two-Mix, released by King Records on July 27, 2022. It features artists such as Angela, Nagi Yanagi, Hikaru Midorikawa, Chihiro Yonekura, and others.

The album peaked at No. 43 on Oricon's weekly albums chart and No. 29 on Billboard Japans Hot Albums chart.

Track listing

Charts

References

External links 
 

2022 compilation albums
Two-Mix compilation albums
Covers albums
Japanese-language compilation albums
King Records (Japan) compilation albums